The International Journal of Educational Technology in Higher Education is a peer-reviewed academic journal that covers all aspects of educational technology in higher education. The journal is diamond open access: authors do not need to pay an article-processing charge. The journal was established in 2004 as the Universities and Knowledge Society Journal, published by the  Open University of Catalonia. It obtained its current name in 2016 when it moved to Springer Science+Business Media. The editors-in-chief are Josep M. Duart (Universitat Oberta de Catalunya), Álvaro Galvis (Universidad de los Andes), Mairéad Nic Giolla Mhichíl (Dublin City University), and Airina Volungevičienė (Vytautas Magnus University).

Abstracting and indexing
The journal is abstracted and indexed:
Current Contents/Social and Behavioral Sciences
EBSCO databases
HeinOnline
Scopus
Social Sciences Citation Index
According to the Journal Citation Reports, the journal has a 2021 impact factor of 7.611.

References

External links

Education journals
English-language journals
Springer Science+Business Media academic journals